"You Can't Resist It" is a song recorded written and originally recorded by Lyle Lovett on his 1986 self-titled debut album. It was included on the soundtrack to the 1991 film Switch, from which it was released as a single. 

A live version from the album Live from Texas was released as a single in 1999, becoming a top 10 hit on the Adult Alternative Songs chart.

Chart performance

Patricia Conroy version

"You Can't Resist It" was also recorded by Canadian country music artist Patricia Conroy. It was released in 1995 as the third single from her third studio album, You Can't Resist. It peaked at number 5 on the RPM Country Tracks chart in July 1995.

Chart performance

Year-end charts

Uses in pop culture
In 1991, the song was used in the Season Three episode of the TV series Midnight Caller entitled "The Added Starter".

References

1986 songs
1991 singles
1995 singles
Lyle Lovett songs
Patricia Conroy songs
MCA Records singles
Warner Music Group singles
Songs written by Lyle Lovett